Shako Chikaidze Stadium is a multi-use stadium in Rustavi, Georgia.  It is used mostly for football matches and is the home stadium of FC Rustavi. The stadium is able to hold 4,657 people. Original capacity before installing individual seats was 10,720.

This stadium is the smallest of ten submitted stadia for the 2020 UEFA European Football Championships.

See also 
Stadiums in Georgia

Sports venues in Georgia (country)
Football venues in Georgia (country)
Rustavi
Buildings and structures in Kvemo Kartli